Wills Point Independent School District is a school district based in Wills Point, Texas (USA) and covering all of the city of Wills Point as well as the communities of Hiram, Myrtle Springs, Scott, Elwood, Cobb, Frog, Elmo, and the surrounding unincorporated areas in both Van Zandt and Kaufman counties.

In 2009, the school district was rated "academically acceptable" by the Texas Education Agency.

Schools

High school 
 Wills Point High School

Middle schools 
 Wills Point Middle School
 Wills Point Jr. High School

Elementary schools 
 Wills Point Primary School
 Earnest O. Woods Intermediate School

See also 
 List of school districts in Texas

References

Links/References 
 
 TEA Report

School districts in Van Zandt County, Texas
School districts in Kaufman County, Texas